Bamakuno Forest Park, or Bama Kuno, is a forest park in the Gambia. Established on January 1, 1954, it covers 1092 hectares. It is located 25 km to the south east of Brikama town in The Gambia.

Many species of birds live in the park, such as African green pigeon, yellow belly Hiliotas, brown-backed woodpecker, blood-chested bird beard, dwarf weber, chirping siffling, brown ice woodpecker, bearded barbel, bronze shiny starlings, black-crowned chagra, an African golden oriole, a black-winged red bishop, and a red-winged goblet.

References
 

Protected areas established in 1954
Forest parks of the Gambia